The 1995 Regal Welsh Open was a professional ranking snooker tournament that took place between 22 and 29 January 1995 at the Newport Centre in Newport, Wales.

Steve Davis was the defending champion, and successfully retained his title, winning the final 9–3 against John Higgins and as a result earned £32,500. This was the 28th and final ranking event he won. The highest break of the televised stage was 135 made by Peter Ebdon.

Ranking points

Main draw

Final

References

Welsh Open (snooker)
Welsh Open
Open (snooker)
Welsh Open snooker in Newport
1990s in Cardiff